Wing Commander Robert Roland Stanford Tuck,  (1 July 1916 – 5 May 1987) was a British fighter pilot, flying ace and test pilot. Tuck joined the Royal Air Force (RAF) in 1935 and first engaged in combat during the Battle of France, over Dunkirk, claiming his first victories. In September 1940 he was promoted to squadron leader and commanded a Hawker Hurricane squadron. In 1941–1942, Tuck participated in fighter sweeps over northern France. On 28 January 1942, he was hit by anti-aircraft fire, was forced to land in France, and was taken prisoner. At the time of his capture, Tuck had claimed 29 enemy aircraft destroyed, two shared destroyed, six probably destroyed, six damaged and one shared damaged.

Early years
Tuck was born in Catford, southeast London. After a less-than-stellar school career he left St Dunstan's College, Catford in 1932 to join the Merchant Navy as a sea cadet (seaman's Discharge Number R112769) aboard the SS Marconi from 19 May 1933 before joining the RAF on a short service commission as an acting pilot officer in 1935. Following flying training, Tuck joined 65 Squadron in September 1935 as an acting probationary pilot officer. He became a pilot officer on probation in September 1936 and his pilot officer rank was confirmed in early 1937 (which was backdated to December 1936). In September 1938 he was promoted to flying officer. With 65 Squadron he flew the Gloster Gauntlet and then the Gloster Gladiator biplanes. In January 1938 practicing formation flying in a Gladiator over the town of Uckfield in East Sussex, Tuck was involved in a fatal mid-air collision with another pilot. He himself escaped by parachute, with two lost teeth and a severe cut to his cheek. In May 1940, he was posted to 92 Squadron, based at Croydon, as a flight commander flying Spitfires.

Second World War

Battle of France
Tuck led his first combat patrol on 23 May 1940, over Dunkirk, claiming three German fighters shot down. The following day he shot down two German bombers and as aerial fighting intensified over the next two weeks his score rapidly mounted. Tuck was awarded the Distinguished Flying Cross (DFC) on 11 June and received it from King George VI at RAF Hornchurch on 28 June. The citation for this award, published in the London Gazette read "...this officer led his flight in company with his squadron on two offensive patrols over Northern France. As a result of one of these patrols in which the squadron engaged a formation of some 60 enemy aircraft, the Squadron Commander was later reported missing, and the flight commander wounded and in hospital. Flight Lieutenant Tuck assumed command, and on the following day led the squadron, consisting of only eight aircraft, on a further patrol engaging an enemy formation of fifty aircraft. During these engagements the squadron has shot down ten enemy aircraft and possibly another twenty-four. Throughout the combats this officer has displayed great dash and gallantry.

Battle of Britain

His combat successes continued into July and August as the Battle of Britain gathered pace, although he himself was forced to bail out on 18 August. While attacking a formation of Junkers Ju 88s over Kent, he shot one down and damaged another. However, during the head on attack at Ju 88, when he overtook it, cannon shells hit his Spitfire and he was forced to bail out near Tunbridge Wells. He fell at Tucks Cottage, near Park Farm, Horsmonden. In another incident on 25 August Tuck's Spitfire was badly damaged during combat with a Dornier Do 17 bomber, which he destroyed 15 miles off the coast. His aircraft had a dead engine, but he glided it back to dry land and made a forced landing.

On 11 September, during the height of the Battle of Britain, Tuck was promoted to acting squadron leader and posted to command the Hawker Hurricane-equipped No. 257 Squadron RAF, based at RAF Coltishall (his substantive rank had been raised to flight lieutenant on 3 September). He led his squadron into combat through September and continued to claim further victories. His last two official victories of the Battle were on 28 October, where he claimed two "probable" Bf 109s. He received a Bar to his DFC on 25 October. The official citation for his second DFC, published in the London Gazette reads:

The identity of this later victory, achieved on 23 September 1940, is believed by one source to be the future German ace Hans-Joachim Marseille. Flying Bf 109 E-7, Werknummer (W.Nr) 5094, Marseille was pursued to the Cap Gris Nez area near Calais, France, and forced to take to his parachute. He was later rescued by a Heinkel He 59 float plane. Tuck was credited with the destruction of W.Nr. 5094, whose pilot, Marseille, was the only recorded German airman rescued in the location on that date. Tuck's official claim was for a Bf 109 destroyed off Griz Nez at 09:45—the only pilot to submit a claim in that location. Another source states that Pilot Officer George Bennions from No. 41 Squadron RAF dispatched Marseille. This same source credits Tuck with a victory over Oberleutnant Walter Radlick of III. Gruppe of Jagdgeschwader 53.

Fighter sweeps
In January 1941, Tuck was awarded the Distinguished Service Order (DSO) and the citation published in the London Gazette reads:

In March 1941, Tuck was awarded a second Bar to his DFC, the citation published in the London Gazette reading:

In June 1941, Tuck survived being shot down over the English Channel, being rescued by a Gravesend coal barge. Tuck claimed a total of seven destroyed, four probables and two damaged on the Hawker Hurricane.

Tuck had an extraordinary piece of ill-fortune when he intercepted a German bomber heading towards Cardiff. He fired at extreme range in poor light, causing it to jettison its bombs in open countryside instead of on the city. The last of its stick of bombs caught one corner of an army training camp and killed one soldier. The soldier was the husband of Tuck's sister.

Having already been the subject of one of Cuthbert Orde's iconic charcoal drawing portraits in September 1940, Tuck sat for a second picture by Orde – this time a full colour oil painting – in 1941.

In July, 1941, Tuck was promoted to acting wing commander and appointed wing leader at RAF Duxford where he led fighter sweeps into northern France. After a brief trip to America with Adolph Malan and Harry Broadhurst to evaluate lend-lease aircraft and train American pilots, he returned to a posting at RAF Biggin Hill as wing leader, from where he flew his last missions.

Prisoner-of-war
Tuck's final wartime mission occurred on 28 January 1942 when he was shot down over Northern France while on a low-level fighter sweep known as a "Rhubarb" mission over northern France. After his Spitfire was hit by enemy ground-based flak near Boulogne forcing him to crash land, he was captured by the German troops he had been firing upon just before his aircraft was hit.

Tuck later recorded he feared for his life as their mood was very hostile. However, he noted his "Tuck's luck" came to his rescue when his captors spotted that, by remarkable chance, one of his 20mm cannon shells had gone precisely down the barrel of a similar-sized ground weapon before exploding. This had caused the barrel of the German gun to peel open "like a banana". The German troops thought this was so hilarious that, in their enthusiasm to slap his back in congratulations saying "Good shooting Tommy!", they were actually trampling the bodies of their dead comrades.

Tuck was first sent to Stalag Luft III at Żagań (Sagan) where he participated in some of the early planning for the Great Escape but was moved to Belaria, a subcamp of Stalag Luft III before the mass breakout happened in March 1944. He remained at Belaria until advancing Russian forces forced the Germans to evacuate the camp in March 1945. He finally escaped from captivity along with the Polish RAF Battle of Britain ace, Zbigniew "Zbishek" Kustrzyński, on 1 February 1945 by hiding in a barn during the westward march. They finally found the advancing Russian front line where Kustrzynski's Russian, learned from his childhood in Moscow where his father was a Polish embassy official, was crucial to their being accepted by the battle weary Russian soldiers. They had to fight alongside the Russian troops until they were eventually transported to Vladivostok where they boarded a ship to Southampton, England.

Post-war RAF career
Tuck's squadron leader rank was made permanent in September 1945, and he became a temporary wing commander in April 1946. He received his final decoration, the American Distinguished Flying Cross on 14 June 1946, before he retired from the RAF and active service on 13 May 1949, having had his permanent rank promoted to wing commander in July 1947. His final accredited aerial kills numbered 27 (plus two shared) destroyed, one (plus one shared) unconfirmed destroyed, six probables and six (plus one shared) damaged.

Later life
Following retirement Tuck continued flying as a test pilot, including working on the RAF's long-serving English Electric Canberra.

In 1953 he and his wife Joyce, whom he married in 1945, moved to The Lynch at Eastry with their two sons, Michael and Simon. He developed a mushroom farm in collaboration with Mr. Douglas Miller and successfully farmed mushrooms for over 20 years. Tuck found peace and contentment on his mushroom farm in Kent, choosing to shun the publicity enjoyed by some of his better known Battle of Britain comrades. He retired to Sandwich Bay in the 1970s where he was a member of St. George's Golf Club.

He was the subject of This Is Your Life in 1956 when he was surprised by Eamonn Andrews at the BBC Television Theatre.

Fly For Your Life by Larry Forrester, is a biography of his life.

Tuck also worked as a technical adviser to the film Battle of Britain (1969). He had already developed a close friendship with the German fighter ace Adolf Galland who was also a technical advisor to the film. Testimony of this friendship is the fact that Tuck was the godfather of Galland's son Andreas Hubertus, born 7 November 1966.

Robert Stanford Tuck died on 5 May 1987 at the age of 70.

Memorials

On 9 May 2008, a plaque was unveiled in Tuck's memory at the Parish Church of St Clement, Sandwich, Kent. It reads: "In memory of Wing Commander Roland Robert Stanford-Tuck DSO DFC** DFC(USA) AFC RAF. 1916–1987. A courageous officer who defended this nation in the skies above Kent during the Battle of Britain in 1940 and whose remains are interred with those of his beloved wife Joyce in the Churchyard".

References

Notes

Citations

Bibliography

 
Battle for the Battle of Britain: The Making of the Movie DVD (released in conjunction with The Battle of Britain DVD). MGM Entertainment, 2004.
 
 Forrester, Larry. Fly for Your Life: The Story of RR Stanford Tuck, DSO, DFC (Fortunes of War). London: Cerberus Publishing Ltd., 2005, 2001. .

External links
LA times obituary
Biography at Battle of Britain Memorial website
Six Aircraft of WGCDR Robert Stanford Tuck

1916 births
1987 deaths
People educated at St Dunstan's College
Royal Air Force wing commanders
Companions of the Distinguished Service Order
Recipients of the Distinguished Flying Cross (United States)
People from Catford
British World War II flying aces
Royal Air Force pilots of World War II
The Few
Military personnel from London
English aviators
English test pilots
Recipients of the Distinguished Flying Cross (United Kingdom)
Wing leaders
Recipients of the Air Force Cross (United Kingdom)